Burbank is a census-designated place (CDP) in Walla Walla County, Washington, United States, where the Snake River meets the Columbia. The population was 3,291 at the 2010 census.  Named for Luther Burbank, the city is located just east of Pasco and Kennewick, across the Snake and Columbia Rivers, respectively. Burbank is part of the Tri-Cities, WA urban area, despite being located in the Walla Walla metropolitan area (which includes all of Walla Walla and Columbia counties).

Geography
Burbank Washington is located at  (46.195392, -119.000477).

According to the United States Census Bureau, the CDP has a total area of 15.0 square miles (38.8 km2), of which, 13.3 square miles (34.4 km2) of it is land and 1.7 square miles (4.4 km2) of it (11.36%) is water.

Climate
According to the Köppen Climate Classification system, Burbank has a semi-arid climate, abbreviated "BSk" on climate maps.

The highest temperature ever measured in Washington state was recorded at the nearby Ice Harbor Dam, at 118 °F (47.8 °C), on August 5, 1961 (The same temperature has also been recorded in July elsewhere).

Demographics
As of the census of 2000, there were 3,303 people, 1,089 households, and 908 families residing in the CDP. The population density was 249.0 people per square mile (96.1/km2). There were 1,124 housing units at an average density of 84.7/sq mi (32.7/km2). The racial makeup of the CDP was 90.16% White, 0.30% African American, 0.82% Native American, 0.36% Asian, 0.12% Pacific Islander, 5.81% from other races, and 2.42% from two or more races. Hispanic or Latino of any race were 9.93% of the population.

There were 1,089 households, out of which 41.7% had children under the age of 18 living with them, 71.7% were married couples living together, 7.3% had a female householder with no husband present, and 16.6% were non-families. 13.1% of all households were made up of individuals, and 5.3% had someone living alone who was 65 years of age or older. The average household size was 3.03 and the average family size was 3.29.

In the CDP, the age distribution of the population shows 31.1% under the age of 18, 7.6% from 18 to 24, 28.8% from 25 to 44, 24.6% from 45 to 64, and 8.0% who were 65 years of age or older. The median age was 35 years. For every 100 females, there were 100.2 males. For every 100 females age 18 and over, there were 100.5 males.

The median income for a household in the CDP was $50,522, and the median income for a family was $52,146. Males had a median income of $40,343 versus $28,580 for females. The per capita income for the CDP was $17,105. About 3.4% of families and 6.5% of the population were below the poverty line, including 11.5% of those under age 18 and none of those age 65 or over.

Notable residents
 Chuck Palahniuk, author

References

External links
 Tri-City Regional Chamber of Commerce

Census-designated places in Washington (state)
Tri-Cities, Washington
Census-designated places in Walla Walla County, Washington
Washington (state) populated places on the Columbia River